Arian Sheta (born 13 February 1981) is an Albanian profesionist footballer who plays as a centre-back for Albanian club Besëlidhja Lezhë.

He is a defender and has previously also played for Kallithea FC in Greece, Ayia Napa FC in Cyprus and KS Elbasani in Albania.

Club career
In June 2014, Sheta completed a transfer to fellow top flight side Laçi, signing only for the club's European matches in summer.

After initially announced his retirement, in April 2018, Sheta accepted an offer to join Dinamo Tirana in Albanian First Division on a one-year contract.

Ahead of the 2019–20 season, Sheta joined Albanian First Division club Besëlidhja Lezhë.

International career
Sheta earned his first and only cap for Albania senior team on 13 March 2002 in a friendly match against Mexico which ended in a 4–0 defeat.

Honours
Teuta Durrës
 Albanian Cup: 1999–00

Tirana
 Albanian Superliga: 2000–01, 2001–02
 Albanian Cup: 2000–01, 2001–02
 Albanian Supercup: 2000

Laçi
 Albanian Cup: 2014–15

References

External links

 Profile - FSHF
Profile at Insports.gr

1981 births
Living people
Footballers from Tirana
Albanian footballers
Association football central defenders
Albania youth international footballers
Albania under-21 international footballers
Albania international footballers
FK Partizani Tirana players
KF Tirana players
KF Teuta Durrës players
Besa Kavajë players
Kallithea F.C. players
Ayia Napa FC players
KF Elbasani players
KS Kastrioti players
KF Laçi players
KF Korabi Peshkopi players
FK Dinamo Tirana players
Besëlidhja Lezhë players
Kategoria Superiore players
Kategoria e Parë players
Super League Greece players
Cypriot First Division players
Albanian expatriate footballers
Expatriate footballers in Cyprus
Expatriate footballers in Greece
Albanian expatriate sportspeople in Greece
Albanian expatriate sportspeople in Cyprus